Carl Edward Heastie (born September 25, 1967) is an American politician from New York. Heastie has served in the New York State Assembly since January 2001, and was elected Speaker of the New York State Assembly on February 3, 2015.

Early life and education 

Born in New York City, Heastie earned a Bachelor of Science degree in Applied Mathematics and Statistics from Stony Brook University in Suffolk County, New York, and a M.B.A. in Finance from Baruch College in New York City.

Career
Before his election to the Assembly, Heastie worked as a budget analyst for the New York City Comptroller. Heastie has also worked as an adjunct professor at Monroe College.

New York State Assembly 
Heastie was first elected to the New York State Assembly in 2000 and represents the 83rd District, which covers the Williamsbridge, Wakefield, Edenwald, Eastchester, and Baychester sections of the Northeast Bronx.

Since joining the Assembly, Heastie became one of the lead negotiators for the construction of a new K-8 school in his district. He has also sponsored legislation to require mandatory reporting of alleged child abuse of students in New York City. He became Chair of the Assembly Labor Committee in 2013.

Heastie became Chair of the Bronx Democratic Party in 2008, a post that he relinquished after becoming Assembly Speaker in 2015.

Speaker of New York State Assembly 
In January 2015, Heastie's Assembly colleagues considered him a frontrunner to be elected Speaker, following the arrest of Sheldon Silver on federal corruption charges led by U.S. Attorney Preet Bharara. On February 2, Assembly Democrats voted unanimously for Heastie to become the new Speaker. The full Assembly elected him Speaker of the Assembly the next day.

Heastie is the first African-American to serve the position. One of his first New York City appearances after becoming speaker was at Al Sharpton's rally in Harlem, where he told the crowd, "This is a tremendous opportunity for our community, for the first time, to have one of us sit at the table," and added "All of you are going to be sitting at that table with me for the first time".

In April 2015, it was reported that, contrary to a judge's instructions, Heastie had neglected to sell a home that his mother, Helene Heastie, according to prosecutors bought with money embezzled from a nonprofit charity. After his mother's death, Heastie ceased attempts to sell the home, having been advised by his lawyer that he was no longer obligated to do so, and later sold it for a profit of $200,000. An independent forfeiture law expert consulted by the New York Times agreed, explaining that the judge's order was "probably legally unenforceable without a formal forfeiture agreement," which prosecutors had not obtained. In addition, prosecutors did not follow the judge's instructions to file a civil judgement against Heastie's mother. When asked in 2015 why no civil judgement was sought, the District Attorney's office was unable to explain why this routine filing had not occurred. In 2015, Heastie's office issued a statement about the incident, saying that "the lessons imparted to the speaker [Heastie]... included owning up to mistakes and taking responsibility."

Personal life 
Heastie has a daughter from a previous marriage.

See also 
 List of members of the New York State Assembly

References

External links
New York State Assembly Member Website

|-

|-

1967 births
2016 United States presidential electors
2020 United States presidential electors
20th-century African-American people
21st-century African-American politicians
21st-century American politicians
African-American state legislators in New York (state)
Baruch College alumni
Living people
Politicians from the Bronx
Speakers of the New York State Assembly
Democratic Party members of the New York State Assembly
Stony Brook University alumni